The uninhabited Imiqqutailaqtuuq Islands are located in Roes Welcome Sound, closer to the mainland than Southampton Island. The island group is a part of the Qikiqtaaluk Region, in the Canadian territory of Nunavut.

References

External links 
 Imiqqutailaqtuuq Islands in the Atlas of Canada - Toporama; Natural Resources Canada

Uninhabited islands of Qikiqtaaluk Region